Norland, also known as Norwood, is a former census-designated place located in northern Miami-Dade County, Florida.  The population was 22,995 at the 2000 census.  The latest estimated population stands at 23,500. In 2003 the majority of this CDP was incorporated into the city of Miami Gardens and now serves as one of the city's neighborhoods.

Geography
Norland is located at  (25.947070, -80.210939).

According to the United States Census Bureau, the CDP has a total area of 9.5 km2 (3.7 mi2).  9.3 km2 (3.6 mi2) of it is land and 0.1 km2 (0.04 mi2) of it (1.10%) is water.

Demographics

As of the census of 2000, there were 22,995 people, 6,966 households, and 5,315 families residing in the CDP.  The population density was 2,459.4/km2 (6,369.3/mi2).  There were 7,399 housing units at an average density of 791.3/km2 (2,049.4/mi2).  The racial makeup of the CDP was 13.00% White (7.7% were Non-Hispanic White,) 79.52% African American, 0.15% Native American, 1.08% Asian, 2.18% from other races, and 4.07% from two or more races. Hispanic or Latino of any race were 9.94% of the population.

There were 6,966 households, out of which 44.3% had children under the age of 18 living with them, 40.6% were married couples living together, 28.0% had a female householder with no husband present, and 23.7% were non-families. 19.7% of all households were made up of individuals, and 6.6% had someone living alone who was 65 years of age or older.  The average household size was 3.24 and the average family size was 3.68.

In the CDP, the population was spread out, with 32.1% under the age of 18, 10.6% from 18 to 24, 28.3% from 25 to 44, 19.7% from 45 to 64, and 9.3% who were 65 years of age or older.  The median age was 30 years. For every 100 females, there were 85.1 males.  For every 100 females age 18 and over, there were 78.8 males.

The median income for a household in the CDP was $36,242, and the median income for a family was $38,648. Males had a median income of $27,459 versus $24,350 for females. The per capita income for the CDP was $13,718.  About 12.7% of families and 16.0% of the population were below the poverty line, including 19.6% of those under age 18 and 17.9% of those age 65 or over.

As of 2000, before being annexed to Miami Gardens, English as a first language accounted for 74.87% of all residents, while French Creole accounted for 12.92%, Spanish was at 10.19%, and French as a mother tongue made up 1.02% of the population.

Education
Miami-Dade County Public Schools operates area public schools. Schools in the former Norland CDP include:
 Secondary
 Miami Norland High School
 Norland Middle School
 Elementary
 Hibiscus Elementary School
 Norland Elementary School
 Norwood Elementary School
 Parkway Elementary School

References

Further reading
 
 The 1990 U.S. Census Bureau map of Dade County, Florida has this CDP on Page 3

External links
 Norland, Florida (FL 33169) profile:
Norland, FL Community Profile

Former census-designated places in Miami-Dade County, Florida
Neighborhoods in Miami Gardens, Florida
Former census-designated places in Florida